Allan Robert Wilson (August 20, 1894 – December 3, 1940) was a Canadian professional ice hockey player. He played with the Ottawa Senators of the National Hockey Association during the 1913–14 season.

Wilson, a defenceman, was also a member of the New Glasgow Cubs of the Maritime Professional Hockey League in 1912–13.

References

Notes

1894 births
1940 deaths
Canadian ice hockey defencemen
Ice hockey people from Ontario
Ottawa Senators (NHA) players
People from Pembroke, Ontario